Proablepharus tenuis, also known commonly as Broom's small skink and the northern soil-crevice skink, is a species of skink, a lizard in the family Scincidae. The species is endemic to Australia.

Geographic range
Within Australia, P. tenuis is found in northern Northern Territory, northern Queensland, and northern Western Australia.

Habitat
The preferred natural habitats of P. tenuis are forest and savanna.

Reproduction
P. tenuis is oviparous.

References

Further reading
Broom R (1896). "On Two new Species of Ablepharus from North Queensland". Annals and Magazine of Natural History, Sixth Series 18: 342–344. (Ablepharus tenuis, new species, pp. 342–343).
Cogger HG (2014). Reptiles and Amphibians of Australia, Seventh Edition. Clayton, Victoria, Australia: CSIRO Publishing. xxx + 1,033 pp. .
Wilson S, Swan G (2013). A Complete Guide to Reptiles of Australia, Fourth Edition. Sydney: New Holland Publishers. 522 pp. .

Proablepharus
Reptiles described in 1896
Skinks of Australia
Endemic fauna of Australia
Taxa named by Robert Broom